is a Japanese volleyball player who plays for Toray Arrows.

Clubs
 Kyushubunka high school
 Toray Arrows (2004–2013)

Awards

Individual 
 2007-2008 V.Premier League - Best Receiver
 2008 Asian Club Championship "Best Libero"
 2009-2010 V.Premier League - Best Libero

Team 
2007 Domestic Sports Festival (Volleyball) -  Champion, with Toray Arrows
2007-2008 Empress's Cup -   Champion, with Toray Arrows
2007-2008 V.Premier League -  Champion, with Toray Arrows
2008 Domestic Sports Festival -  Runner-Up, with Toray Arrows
 2008 Asian Club Championship -  Bronze Medal with Toray Arrows
2008-2009 V.Premier League -  Champion, with Toray Arrows
2009 Kurowashiki All Japan Volleyball Championship -  Champion, with Toray Arrows
2009-2010 V.Premier League -  Champion, with Toray Arrows
2010 Kurowashiki All Japan Volleyball Championship -  Champion, with Toray Arrows
2010-11 V.Premier League -  Runner-up, with Toray Arrows

National team 
2010 World Championship - Bronze medal
2011 Montreux Volley Masters -  Champion

References

External links
Toray Arrows Women's Volleyball Team
FIVB biography

Living people
Sportspeople from Nagasaki Prefecture
1985 births
Japanese women's volleyball players